Khalil Thompson (born February 3, 1997) is an American fencer. He qualified to represent Team USA in the 2020 Tokyo Summer Olympics, competing as part of the Men's Sabre Team, which ranked 8th.

Career highlights 
 Senior World Championship Teams: 2019
 Pan American Championship Teams: 2019 (Gold - Team)

References

External links
 Penn State Nittany Lions bio

1997 births
Living people
American male sabre fencers
Olympic fencers of the United States
Fencers at the 2020 Summer Olympics
Penn State Nittany Lions fencers
Sportspeople from Los Angeles